Agnès Merlet (born 4 January 1959) is a French film director who is known for directing Son of the Shark, Artemisia and Dorothy Mills. Recently she directed the Irish/French/Swedish co-production Hideaways starring Rachel Hurd-Wood and Harry Treadaway.

Filmography

Director
Hideaways (2011)
Dorothy Mills (2008)
Artemisia (1997)
Son of the Shark (1993)
Poussières d'étoiles (1986)
Guerre des pâtes, La (1985)

Writer
Dorothy Mills (2008)
Artemisia (1997)

Producer
Dorothy Mills (2008)

External links

1959 births
Living people
European Film Awards winners (people)
French film directors
French women screenwriters
French screenwriters
French women film directors